The 2011 Boston College Eagles football team represented Boston College as a member of the Atlantic Division of the Atlantic Coast Conference (ACC) in the 2011 NCAA Division I FBS football season. The Eagles were led by third-year head coach Frank Spaziani and played their home games at Alumni Stadium. They finished the season 4–8 overall and 3–5 in ACC play to place fifth in Atlantic Division.

Schedule

Roster

Drafted Payers (2012 NFL Draft)

References

Boston College
Boston College Eagles football seasons
Boston College Eagles football
Boston College Eagles football